Kosta Vangjeli (born 21 July 2000) is a Greek–born Albanian professional footballer who currently play as a right-back for Albanian club Skënderbeu.

References

2000 births
Living people
Greek footballers
Footballers from Thessaloniki
Albanians in Greece
Albanian footballers
Association football defenders
KF Skënderbeu Korçë players
Kategoria Superiore players